Silverstein may refer to:

Silverstein (surname)
Silverstein (band), a Canadian post-hardcore band
Silverstein Committee, 1959 United States government commission on the Saturn program
Silverstein Properties, a real estate development and management company

See also
Silberstein